Loma Larga Tunnel, or, as it is known by the locals, Túnel de la Loma Larga, is a road tunnel beneath the Cerro de la Loma Larga, in the limits of the cities of Monterrey and San Pedro Garza García in Nuevo León, México.

The work itself in fact is two tunnels, holding three lanes each (a fourth one is destined for emergencies).

The tunnel is almost two kilometers long. The lanes flowing south end in the municipality of San Pedro Garza García, while the ones flowing north end in Monterrey.

Gallery

See also
Monterrey

References

Buildings and structures in Monterrey
Tunnels in Mexico
Road tunnels